Gregory Michael Piper (born 31 August 1957 in Coffs Harbour, New South Wales), an Australian politician, is the independent member of the New South Wales Legislative Assembly representing Lake Macquarie since 2007. Piper also served as Mayor of City of Lake Macquarie between 2004 and 2012, prior to the enactment of the  preventing dual membership of state parliament and local council.

Early years and background
Piper grew up in the Lake Macquarie suburb of Kahibah. He has three children and five grandchildren. In his teenage years, he attended St Pius X high school in Adamstown. When Piper finished school, he worked in Steelworks for a year. When he didn't see a future there, he took a nursing job at Morisset Hospital, where he worked for 26 years. He now lives on the Morisset Peninsula in Mirrabooka, near the Westlakes suburb of Morisset, with his wife Lyn.

Political career
Piper was first elected to the City of Lake Macquarie Council in 1991 as an independent councillor and served as deputy mayor through 2000. He sat on and chaired numerous council and state government committees. Piper held the position of chair of the Lake Macquarie Estuary Management Committee and the Lake Macquarie Project Management Committee since the establishment of each. He also served on Hunter Waste Management and Planning Board for a number of years including a period as chair. He was directly elected as the mayor of Lake Macquarie in March 2004 and again in September 2008, where he received 60% of the first-preference vote.

Piper was elected as the member for Lake Macquarie at the 2007 general election. Piper has sat on the Legislative Assembly's Broadband Committee and currently is a member of the Natural Resources Committee (Climate Change).

He was overwhelmingly reelected in the 2019 New South Wales state election, winning by a two-candidate vote of 72.6% against Labor's Jo Smith.

Political views
According to his web site, he is "left leaning, socially progressive, fiscally cautious, pragmatic, swinging voter; and staunchly Independent."

References

 

Members of the New South Wales Legislative Assembly
1957 births
City of Lake Macquarie
Living people
Independent members of the Parliament of New South Wales
People from the Hunter Region
Mayors of places in New South Wales
21st-century Australian politicians